The Islamist insurgency in Iraqi Kurdistan was a military conflict in Iraqi Kurdistan between the Islamist militant group Ansar al-Islam and the Kurdistan Regional Government (KRG). The conflict began in 2001, but subsequently merged with the larger 2003 invasion of Iraq. After the invasion, Ansar al-Islam continued a low-level terrorist insurgency against the KRG.

Background
Ansar al-Islam was formed in September 2001 when Jund al-Islam merged with a splinter group from the Islamic Movement of Kurdistan, under the leadership of Mullah Krekar. According to the PUK, the group consisted of Kurdish veterans of Jihad who had gone to Afghanistan to fight alongside Taliban against the Soviet invasion in the 80s. They came back to Kurdistan after the defeat of the Taliban government in Afghanistan in 2001.  Ansar al-Islam imposed Sharia in the villages they controlled around Biyara, close to the border to Iran.

Ansar al-Islam's rule
Human Rights Watch has accused Ansar al-Islam of committing atrocities against the civilian population in the territory which they controlled. It has been alleged that Ansar al-Islam harshly persecuted the Yarsan religious minority, and enforced strict Islamic law. Human Rights Watch also accused Ansar al-Islam fighters of torturing prisoners and summarily executing captured PUK soldiers. After the Battle of Kheli Hama, Ansar al-Islam were again accused of beheading and mutilating captured PUK prisoners.

Assassination attempts
After 2 unsuccessful assassination attempts on Franso Hariri by Ansar al-Islam in Erbil in 1994 and 1997, a third assassination attempt in 2001 on Hariri succeeded. It happened on the same exact street as the previous 2.

An unsuccessful attempt was made on the life of Barham Salih in April 2002 by Ansar al-Islam. At the time, Saleh was the PUK Regional Government Prime Minister. Later in February 2003 Ansar al-Islam assassinated the prominent PUK commander Shawkat Haji Mushir, along with five other people.

In March 2004 the US State Department officially classified Ansar al-Islam as a terrorist organization.

2003 Invasion of Iraq

During the 2003 Invasion of Iraq, US forces aided the PUK in attacking Ansar al-Islam. In late March 2003, PUK forces supported by American special forces captured Halabja after several days of heavy fighting. The surviving Ansar al-Islam forces fled to Iran.

American intelligence personnel inspected the suspected chemical weapons site in Sargat and discovered traces of Ricin in the ruins, as well as potassium chloride. They also discovered chemical weapons suits, atropine nerve gas antidotes, and manuals on manufacturing chemical weapons, lending credence to the idea that the site was related to the manufacture of chemical weapons and poisons.

After the invasion
After their defeat in Iraqi Kurdistan, Ansar al-Islam joined the Iraqi insurgency in Iraq. Several terrorist attacks in the Irbil area have been linked to Ansar al-Islam, including the Assassination of Franso Hariri, and the suicide bombing of the PUK and KDP headquarters in Irbil that killed 117 people. They also carried out the bombing of the Mount Lebanon Hotel in Baghdad on March 17, 2004.

References

Conflicts in 2001
Conflicts in 2002
Conflicts in 2003
2001 in Iraq
2002 in Iraq
2003 in Iraq
Civil wars in Iraq
Civil wars post-1945
Islamist Insurgency
Wars involving the United States